{{DISPLAYTITLE:C3H4O2}}
C3H4O2 may refer to:

Compounds sharing the molecular formula:
 Acrylic acid
 Malondialdehyde
 Methylglyoxal
 3-Oxetanone
 Propiolactone isomers:
 Alpha-Propiolactone (α-propiolactone)
 Beta-Propiolactone (β-propiolactone)